Skip Seagreaves (born April 27, 1982) is a former Canadian football offensive tackle for the Montreal Alouettes of the Canadian Football League. He was signed by the Alouettes as an undrafted free agent in 2006. He played college football at North Carolina.

Skip Seagraves currently resides in Richmond, VA but spends most of his time in Burlington, NC (Alamance County) where he is regarded as a local hero within the Cum Park Plaza Community. He became  successful hometown boy under the tutelage of the Adam Metts and followed Metts to Burlington, then to UNC, then to minor professional football greatness.  Skip is in medical device sales.   He likes to golf in his free time with his best friend Matt Tedder. Skip is also available for appearances and guest speaking events.

External links
Montreal Alouettes bio

1982 births
Living people
People from West Point, New York
American players of Canadian football
Canadian football offensive linemen
North Carolina Tar Heels football players
Montreal Alouettes players
People from Burlington, North Carolina